The Service Personnel and Veterans Agency (SPVA) was an executive agency of the UK Ministry of Defence. The SPVA provided personnel, pensions, welfare and support services to members of the UK Armed Forces, veterans and their dependents. It was formed on 2 April 2007 by merging the former Armed Forces Personnel Administration Agency (AFPAA) with the Veterans Agency. The agency merged in turn with Defence Business Services (DBS) on 1 April 2014.

History
The formation of the SPVA led to the provision of a fully integrated set of ‘through life’ personnel services to the serving and veterans community -  where a single contact with the agency granted access to customer information and advice on pay, pensions, compensation payments, records of service and medal entitlement.

The responsibility for all pension provision, whether a War Pension or an Armed Forces pension fell under the direct control of the SPVA, reducing the risk of omitting or duplicating information.

The SPVA operated from four main sites: Glasgow (Kentigern House), Gloucester (Imjin Barracks), Gosport (Centurion Building) and Norcross (Blackpool).

The SPVA's executive agency status was removed on 16 June 2011 in preparation for it to be merged into the Defence Business Services (DBS) organisation.

On 1 April 2014, the SPVA merged with Defence Business Services as part of the Defence Reform - the merger was recommended in Lord Levene's Defence Reform report, published in 2011. 

The report recommended ‘the establishment of a single delivery organisation – Defence Business Services (DBS) – to deliver transactional and other services in the fields of civilian HR, finance, some elements of information and commercial services, and, at a later date in the transition, security vetting and military HR.’

DBS is now one of three ‘Shared Services Centres’ across the UK government and one of the largest in Europe.

The merger between the Service Personnel and Veterans Agency and DBS will not affect services to veterans. SPVA services for veterans – Armed Forces pensions, compensation schemes, helplines and welfare support – will continue under the ‘Veterans UK’ name. However, the SPVA logo will now be phased out and replaced with the Ministry of Defence Logo.

Phone contacts for veterans services remain unchanged; the Veterans UK Helpline number is 0808 1914 2 18 and the JPAC number is 0800 085 3600.

Functions

JPA

The Joint Personnel Administration (JPA) system rolled out to the RAF on 20 March 2006, the RN in Oct 2006 and the Army in March 2007. JPA involves new, modern personnel administrative processes, based on harmonised policy and regulations. It has been delivered using a commercial software package and is accessible to all service personnel via Defence Information Infrastructure (DII). Individuals have access and responsibility for the upkeep of their own information and can make expenses and allowance claims on-line, via the self-service facility. Continued improvement and development of JPA functionality is an ongoing commitment. There have been (as of 2011) 14 major JPA releases and monthly releases delivering improved system functionality and security.

AFCS

The Armed Forces Compensation Scheme (AFCS) is a package for serving and former members of the Armed Forces. It is designed to provide compensation, irrespective of fault, across the full range of circumstances in which illness, injury or death may arise as a result of service.  AFCS replaced the previous arrangements under the War Pensions Scheme and the attributable elements of AFPS 1975. The scheme covers all Regular and Reserve personnel whose injury, ill health or death is predominantly caused by service on or after 6 April 2005. Tax free lump sum awards, up to £570,000, for injury can be paid in Service, with an additional monthly Guaranteed Income payments, available for the most seriously injured upon leaving the Armed Forces.

Pensions

The agency is responsible for the assessment, award, payment and maintenance of all pensions relating to service in the Armed Forces. This includes the Armed Forces Pension Schemes, Reserve Forces Pension Scheme and, for those disabled or bereaved through service, war disablement pensions, related allowances and other payments to veterans. The agency provides payments to around 584,000 ex-service personnel or dependants each month.

JCCC

The Joint Casualty and Compassionate Centre (JCCC) provides a 24/7 service to members of the Armed Forces. Handling over 90,000 telephone calls a year, it co-ordinates all work relating to current military fatalities, injuries and compassionate cases, including family liaison and repatriation. The JCCC also co-ordinates investigations following the discovery of human remains of personnel, primarily from the First and Second World Wars.

Medals

The MOD Medal Office is responsible for the assessment, engraving and awarding of circa 44,000 current campaign and historic medals a year to past and present members of the Armed Forces. Medals relating to service dating back as far as World War II can still be claimed. Around 200 such applications per week are received from veterans and their families.

Veterans badges

In addition, the agency administered the distribution of the HM Armed Forces Veterans Badge, with over 811,000 issued as at October 2010.

To be eligible to receive a UK Armed Forces Veterans badge, veterans must have been a member of either the Army, Royal Navy, Royal Marines, Royal Air Force (RAF), Volunteer or Regular Reserves.

Veterans support

The SPVA's Veterans Services Directorate provided support to anyone who had served in HM Armed Forces. 

Services provided included a free Veterans-UK helpline and website, providing advice on benefits, compensation payments, pensions, employment and much more. For those with more specific needs, the Veterans Welfare Service (VWS) provided one-to-one advice and support especially in respect of the statutory schemes (WPS and AFCS), in the home if needed. 

VWS had five regional hubs known as Veterans Welfare Centres from 25 offices across the UK. Each centre acted as a first point of contact for welfare delivery, providing professional help, advice and guidance over the phone. From there, a Welfare Manager, local to the client, may have contacted if further assistance with resolving the client's issue was needed. SPVA also administered and managed the Ilford Park Polish Home (IPPH) near Newton Abbot, Devon. The home provides residential and nursing care for former members of the Polish forces who served under British command during WWII in accordance with the Polish Resettlement Act 1947. Despite the increasing age of residents, considerable demand for places at IPPH continues. The home accommodates 98 residents, with an average age of 84.

See also
 Veterans#Britain

References

External links
Veterans-UK website

2007 establishments in the United Kingdom
Defence agencies of the United Kingdom
Defunct executive agencies of the United Kingdom government
Government agencies established in 2007
History of veterans' affairs in the United Kingdom
Veterans' affairs ministries